Robert Benjamin Ageh Wellesley Cole (7 March 1907 – 31 October 1995), was a Sierra Leonean medical doctor who was the first West African to become a Fellow of the Royal College of Surgeons of England.

Background and early life
Robert Benjamin Ageh Wellesley Cole was born at No. 15 Pownall Street, Freetown, Sierra Leone (then a colony of the United Kingdom), to Wilfred Sydney Wellesley Cole and his wife, Elizabeth Cole (née Okrafo-Smart). The Wellesley-Cole family had three other children including Dr. Irene Ighodaro.

The Wellesley-Coles were a Sierra Leone Creole family of partial Caribbean origin who also descended from Wolof and Yoruba Liberated African ancestors. The Okrafo-Smart family was another prominent Creole family largely of Igbo Liberated African descent.

Wilfred Cole was a successful engineer who was the first Sierra Leonean to serve as an assistant for the Public Water Works Department in Freetown. The Wellesley-Cole family was a middle-class Creole family, and Robert Wellesley-Cole grew up in a household of relative comfort and privilege.

Early education
Wellesley-Cole was educated at the Government Model School in Freetown, Sierra Leone where he was taught by teachers such as William Campbell. Following the completion of his primary education, Wellesley-Cole was enrolled as the first student of the Government Model Secondary School, currently known as Prince of Wales Secondary School. Wellesley-Cole completed his studies at Prince of Wales, proceeded to the CMS Grammar School currently known as The Sierra Leone Grammar School where he eventually became Head Prefect (HeadBoy)  in his final year and passed the Cambridge Entrance Certification in 1925.

Academic career
Wellesley-Cole obtained upper-second class honours from Fourah Bay College and proceeded to attend Newcastle University Medical School.

Medical career
Wellesley-Cole was the first West African to become a member of the Royal College of Surgeons of England. Due to discrimination in the West African Medical Service, Wellesley-Cole mainly practiced in the United Kingdom, although he did also practice in Ibadan, Nigeria and in his natal homeland of Sierra Leone.

Following Sierra Leone's Independence on 27 April 1961, then Prime Minister Milton Margai offered Wellesley-Cole the position of senior medical officer.

Activism

Wellesley-Cole co-founded the Society for the Cultural Advancement of Africa, with his sister Irene in 1943.

He was President of the League of Coloured Peoples from 1947-9, following the death of the organisation's founder Dr Harold Moody.

He was a Director of the West African Students Union and a founder member of the West African Society and an editor of the society's journal Africana, as well as a member of the Fabian Society.

Family life

In 1932, Wellesley-Cole married Anna Brodie, his Scottish former landlady. The marriage was later dissolved.

In 1950, he married Amy Manto Bondfield Hotobah-During, a Sierra Leone Creole nurse who was the younger sister of Dr Raymond Sarif Easmon and Bertha Conton and the couple had four children.

Publications
Kossoh Town Boy (Cambridge: Cambridge University Press, 1960)
An Innocent in Britain, or, The Missing Link: a documented autobiography (United Kingdom: Campbell Matthews, 1988)
 Kossoh Town Boy: A Time Capsule of Pre Independence Sierra Leone (Sierra Leone: Koroma Kamanda, 2017)

References

Sierra Leone Creole people
Sierra Leonean people of Caribbean descent
Sierra Leonean people of Yoruba descent
Sierra Leonean people of Igbo descent
Sierra Leonean people of Wolof descent
Sierra Leonean expatriates in the United Kingdom
Sierra Leonean expatriates in Nigeria
Sierra Leonean surgeons
Fourah Bay College alumni
1907 births
1995 deaths
People from Freetown
20th-century Sierra Leonean physicians
20th-century surgeons
Fellows of the Royal College of Surgeons
Members of the Fabian Society